Joseph “Joe” Klotz is an American film editor.  He started his career as a television editor in New York City. Klotz' first feature film as editor, Let It Snow, won the Best Editing prize at the 1999 Festival of the American Film Institute. He was nominated for the 2009 Academy Award for Best Film Editing for Precious. Klotz has been selected for membership in the American Cinema Editors.

Filmography
This filmography is based on the listings at the Internet Movie Database. The count of films edited with each director is indicated in parentheses.

References

Further reading
 Interview with Klotz.
. Posted November 14, 2014.

Syracuse University alumni
American film editors
American Cinema Editors
Living people
Year of birth missing (living people)